Prince George Circuit is a race circuit in East London in Eastern Cape Province, South Africa. On this course the South African Grand Prix was hosted in 1934, and 1936 to 1939 when racing was halted due to World War II, and then in 1960–1966.

Course layout
The start and finish straight ran along the sea shore. After three fast corners the course followed a road – which is now called Molteno Drive – that would later also be part of the shorter new circuit. Moving further east the course entered the West Bank Village on Strand Street before turning north onto Bank Street and then west on Military Road. There the track moved through the areas Fort Glamorgan and Gately. Military Road changed into Settlers Way at the height of Woodbrook and Greenfields. After driving through what is now the East London Airport (not built at the time), the course turned south at the far west point onto Prince George Street and led with a relatively long series of twisty turns and one hairpin at the end back to the main straight.

Instead of taking Molteno Drive east, the course followed Potters Pass north to get back onto the original circuit at the begin of Settlers Way.

It hosted three rounds of the F1 South African Grand Prix in the 1960s. It was later deemed too small for Formula One cars, and the race was moved to Kyalami.

Layout history

References

External Links
 www.kolumbus.fi – Prince George Circuit 

Prince George
Formula One circuits
South African Grand Prix
Sports venues in the Eastern Cape
Motorsport venues in South Africa
East London, Eastern Cape